For the Crown is a 1913 American silent short film written and directed by Lorimer Johnston. The drama stars Charlotte Burton, Helen Armstrong, J. Warren Kerrigan, Louise Lester, George Periolat, Jack Richardson, and Vivian Rich.

External links

1913 films
1913 drama films
Silent American drama films
American silent short films
American black-and-white films
1913 short films
Films directed by Lorimer Johnston
1910s American films